Die Rose vom Liebesgarten is a 1900 opera by Hans Pfitzner to a libretto by James Grun, one of Pfitzner's fellow students at the Frankfurt Conservatory, which had been prompted by an 1890 painting by Hans Thoma Der Wächter vor dem Liebesgarten.

The first act was first premiered in concert in March 1900 where it was poorly received between two pieces by Richard Strauss. The premiere 9 November 1901 in Elberfeld was better received, followed by performances in Mannheim, Bremen, Munich and Hamburg. The opera was published in 1901 and received its first truly successful staging by Mahler in Vienna in 1905.

References

External links
 
 

Operas
1900 operas
Operas by Hans Pfitzner
German-language operas